66 Motel is the name of various independent tourist lodgings on the former Route 66 in the United States of America:
 66 Motel, on the Arizona border in Needles, California
 66 Motel (built circa-1933, demolished June 26, 2001) as a historically-listed site in Tulsa, Oklahoma 
 Route 66 Motel, in Kingman, Arizona

See also
 Buildings and structures on U.S. Route 66